The Steeples, is a  elevation mountain ridge located at the southern end of the Hughes Range in the Canadian Rockies of British Columbia, Canada. Situated immediately east of Norbury Lake Provincial Park and the Rocky Mountain Trench, this prominent five kilometres in length ridge is visible from the Crowsnest Highway and Cranbrook. Its nearest higher peak is Mount Fisher,  to the north-northwest.

History
The Steeples was named in August 1858 by Thomas Blakiston of the Palliser Expedition as presumably it was believed to resemble church steeples.

The mountain's name was officially adopted in 1950 when approved by the Geographical Names Board of Canada.

Climate
Based on the Köppen climate classification, The Steeples has a subarctic climate with cold, snowy winters, and mild summers. Temperatures can drop below −20 °C with wind chill factors below −30 °C. Precipitation runoff from the mountain drains into tributaries of the Kootenay River.

See also

Geography of British Columbia

References

Gallery

External links
 Weather forecast: The Steeples

Two-thousanders of British Columbia
Canadian Rockies
Kootenay Land District